The Medal "To a Partisan of the Patriotic War" (Medal "Partizanu Otechestvennoi voiny") was a World War II Soviet paramilitary award established in two classes on February 2, 1943, by decree of the Presidium of the Supreme Soviet of the USSR. to recognise the fortitude and courage of the partisans on the home front in their struggle to free the Soviet Motherland of the Nazi invaders far behind enemy lines.  Its statute was amended by a further decree of the Presidium of the Supreme Soviet of the USSR on February 26, 1947.

Medal statute
The Medal "To a Partisan of the Patriotic War" was awarded in two classes.
The medal first class was awarded to partisans, to leaders and organizers of partisan units, for outstanding achievements in organizing the guerrilla movement, for bravery, heroism and outstanding achievements displayed in the partisan struggle in the occupied territories of our Soviet Motherland far behind the Nazi lines.
The medal second class was awarded to partisans, to leaders and organizers of partisan units, for personal distinction in combat, in the execution of orders and command assignments, for active support of the guerrilla struggle against the Nazi invaders.

The Medal "To a Partisan of the Patriotic War" was bestowed on behalf of the Presidium of the Supreme Soviet of the USSR.  It was worn on the left side of the chest and in the presence of other medals of the Soviet Union, immediately following the Medal "For Labour Valour".  When worn in the presence of orders and medals of the Russian Federation, the latter have precedence.

Medals "To a Partisan of the Patriotic War" awarded posthumously, along with their relevant award certificates, are transferred to the families for safekeeping and as a memento.

Medal description
The Medal "To a Partisan of the Patriotic War" was a 32mm in diameter circular medal, the medal first class was struck in silver, the medal second class was struck in brass.  Their identical obverses bore the left bust profiles of Lenin and Stalin, the latter being the closer and slightly to the right.  A 3mm wide relief ribbon ran along the entire circumference of the medal, at its very bottom, a relief five pointed star bearing a hammer and sickle and bisecting the inscription "USSR", on the remainder of the ribbon, the relief inscription "To a Partisan of the Patriotic War".  On their also identical reverses, the relief inscription in three lines "For our Soviet Motherland" (Za nashu Sovetskuyo Rodinu), above the inscription, the relief image of the hammer and sickle.

The Medal "To a Partisan of the Patriotic War" was secured by a ring through the medal suspension loop to a standard Soviet pentagonal mount covered by an overlapping 24mm light green silk moiré ribbon, the ribbon for the medal first class had a 2mm wide red central stripe, the stripe was blue for the medal second class.

Recipients (partial list)
The individuals below were all recipients of the Medal "To a Partisan of the Patriotic War".

Dmitry Nikolayevich Medvedev, Hero of the Soviet Union
Oleksiy Fedorov, twice Hero of the Soviet Union
Ina Konstantinova, wartime diarist and Soviet partisan
Valentin Kotyk, partisan scout, posthumous Hero of the Soviet Union
Ivan Turkenich, Ukrainian partisan, posthumous Hero of the Soviet Union
Pyotr Vershigora, Hero of the Soviet Union
Vladimir Druzhynin, Hero of the Soviet Union 
Ivan Banov, Hero of the Soviet Union 
Ilya Starinov
Semyon Rudniev, posthumous Hero of the Soviet Union
Pyotr Masherov, Hero of the Soviet Union
Sydir Kovpak, twice Hero of the Soviet Union
Vasily Korzh, Hero of the Soviet Union 
Ivan Sergeychik, NKVD political commissar with the partisans
Alexander Saburov, teenage partisan and Hero of the Soviet Union 
Ales Adamovich, teenage partisan 
Oleg Koshevoy, founder of the partisan organisation Young Guard 
Oleg Antonov, aircraft designer 
M. A. Yegorov, Hero of the Soviet Union 
Pavel Sudoplatov, Lieutenant General 
Alexander Golovanov, Chief Marshal of Aviation 
Alexander Shelepin Chairman of the KGB from 1958 to 1961

See also
Soviet partisans
The Young Guard
Guerrilla warfare
Orders, decorations, and medals of the Soviet Union

References

External links
 Legal Library of the USSR
 The Russian Gazette

Soviet campaign medals
Military awards and decorations of the Soviet Union
Civil awards and decorations of the Soviet Union
Awards established in 1943
1943 establishments in the Soviet Union